The Drumm Battery Train was an Irish battery electric multiple unit developed in the 1930s which ran successfully in service on the Dublin to  route.  The train's batteries were charged via an overhead pickup at the turnaround station.

The train was a successful implementation of the battery developed by Dr James J. Drumm.

Background 

Dr James J. Drumm developed the traction battery in the late 1920s and was supported by the Irish Government as a means of using the excess electricity generated by the Shannon hydroelectric scheme.

Prototype 
A prototype was developed by converting petrol railcar 386 to Drumm traction Battery operation.

Construction 
Unit A was constructed at Inchicore railway works in 1931 shortly followed by unit B.

Units C and D were constructed in 1938.

Performance 
The recharge time was about 1 minute for each mile to be covered, that is about 15 minutes for Dublin to Bray which could be covered in about 20 minutes nonstop. The geared maximum design speed of units C and D were  though  was touched on an inaugural run and even  has been claimed in service.

Trials 
Several inaugural runs were held in late 1931 including a trip with President Cosgrave on 2 December 1931.

Service 
Units A and B were in service from 1932 to 1949, being joined by units C and D in 1939, though the later units were not as successful as hoped. The Drumm Battery Trains were especially useful in the coal shortages of the early 1940s however were restricted by electricity supply shortages of 1949.

Withdrawal 
The units were withdrawn in 1949 due to the batteries becoming life expired and cheaper alternatives available. The batteries and electrical equipment were removed continuing in service as diesel hauled carriages until 1955. They were stored on a siding at Foxrock until being scrapped.

Incidents
There were two fires in the battery chambers with arcing and considerable heat generated but only charring to the coach body.

Models
A handbuilt model of the Drumm Train is in the Fry Model Railway collection. The model correctly depicts the unit articulated bogie however the front end cab modelling would seem to be proposal for the C and D units but not the actual design used. This is reasonable as Cyril Fry the creator was a draughtsman at Inchicore Works where the units were designed and constructed and would have had access to such drawings.

Further reading

References

External links 
 

Iarnród Éireann multiple units
Battery electric multiple units